Eilema sabulosula is a moth of the subfamily Arctiinae. It was described by Hervé de Toulgoët in 1954. It is found on the island of Madagascar.

References

 

sabulosula
Moths described in 1954